Goran Ivelja (also spelled Ivelj; born 16 August 1979) is a Croatian-Swiss football coach and a former player. He is managing the Under-21 squad of Grasshoppers which plays in the Swiss 1. Liga.

Career 
Ivelja signed for HNK Cibalia in July 2003 he was signed for FC Winterthur on 9 July 2006.

References

External links

 
 

1979 births
Swiss people of Croatian descent
People from Schlieren, Switzerland
Living people
Swiss men's footballers
Association football defenders
FC Wil players
FC Schaffhausen players
FC Wohlen players
FC Concordia Basel players
FC Winterthur players
HNK Cibalia players
Swiss Challenge League players
Croatian Football League players
Swiss football managers
Sportspeople from the canton of Zürich